Selim Bayraktar (born 17 June 1975) is an Iraqi-Turkish actor best known for his role as "Sümbül Ağa" in Muhteşem Yüzyıl. He received international recognition with his role in the Netflix original series Rise of Empires: Ottoman.

Life and career
Bayraktar was born in Kirkuk, Iraq, in 1975, to Iraqi Turkmen parents. As a child he began performing in gymnastic competitions. During the final days of the Iran-Iraq War, a body double of Sadam Hussein visited Bayraktar's schools in order to recruit boys into the army; when Bayraktar was chosen to serve in the army his family decided to smuggle him into Turkey. He started working at the Turkish State Theatre after graduating from Hacettepe University in 2000.

Bayraktar speaks Turkish, Ottoman Turkish, Arabic, Kurdish and English.

Filmography

References

External links 
 
 Selim Bayraktar at KinoTurkey.ru

1975 births
Turkish male film actors
Turkish male television actors
People from Kirkuk
Living people
Iraqi emigrants to Turkey
Turkish people of Iraqi Turkmen descent
Iraqi people of Turkish descent